Koro is an unincorporated community located in the town of Nepeuskun, Winnebago County, Wisconsin, United States. The Koro post office was established in August 1850 by its first postmaster, James H. Foster (who would go on to serve in the Wisconsin State Assembly and Wisconsin Senate). This is the only community by this name in the United States.

Notes

Unincorporated communities in Winnebago County, Wisconsin
Unincorporated communities in Wisconsin